Trapped Beneath the Sea is a 1974 American made-for-television action drama film directed by William A. Graham. The screenplay concerns four men trapped in a mini-submarine in waters off the coast of Florida. Paul Michael Glaser, Joshua Bryant, Cliff Potts and Roger Kern play the victims. Lee J. Cobb and Martin Balsam are among those trying to rescue them. The film premiered as the ABC Movie of the Week on October 22, 1974.

Cast
 Lee J. Cobb as Victor Bateman
 Martin Balsam as T.C. Hollister
 Paul Michael Glaser as Jack Beech
 Joshua Bryant as Sam Wallants
 Barra Grant as Grace Wallants
 Cliff Potts as Gordon Gaines
 Warren Kemmerling as Cmdr. Prestwick
 Laurie Prange as Chris Moffet
 Phillip Richard Allen as Lt. Cmdr. Hanratty
 Redmond Gleeson as PO1 Stanton
 Roger Kern as Jeff Turley
 S. John Launer as Capt. Osborn
 Rod Perry as Jimmy
 William Wintersole as Cmdr. Robbins
 Simon Deckard as Dr. Lewison
 Fred Franklyn (credited as Fredric Franklyn) as Howard Wynter
 Norman Honath as Sailor #1
 Andy Knight as Sailor #2
 Hunter von Leer as Seaman Schrier
 Howard K. Smith as Narrator

See also
 List of American films of 1974

References

External links
 
 

1970s English-language films
1974 television films
1974 films
1970s action films
American disaster films
American films based on actual events
ABC Movie of the Week
Films directed by William Graham (director)
1970s American films